Shariff is a given name and a surname. Notable people with the name include:

Given name 
 Shariff Abdul Samat (1984–2020), Singaporean footballer
 Shariff Enamul Kabir, Bangladeshi academic
 Shariff Mohammed Ahmed (born 1954/55), Indian politician

Surname 
 Aminu Shariff (born 1977), Nigerian filmmaker
 Ashrin Shariff (born 1982), Singaporean footballer
 Mo Shariff (born 1993), English footballer
 Muhammed Sharif (disambiguation)
 Noorel Shariff, Tanzanian tennis player
 Nor Aini Shariff, Malaysian fashion designer
 Shiraz Shariff (born 1954), Canadian politician
 Vempalli Shariff (born 1980), Indian Sheikh
 Yasmin Shariff (born 1956), British architect
 Yeop Mahidin Mohamed Shariff (1918–1999), Malaysian army director

See also
 Sharif (disambiguation)